Joan of Arc is a 1948 American hagiographic epic film directed by Victor Fleming, and starring Ingrid Bergman as the eponymous French religious icon and war heroine. It was produced by Walter Wanger and is based on Maxwell Anderson's successful Broadway play Joan of Lorraine, which also starred Bergman, and was adapted for the screen by Anderson himself, in collaboration with Andrew Solt. It is the only film of an Anderson play for which the author wrote the film script (at least partially). It is the last film Fleming directed before his death in 1949.

Plot
Unlike the play Joan of Lorraine, which is a drama that shows how the story of Joan affects a group of actors who are performing it, the film is a straightforward recounting of the life of the French heroine. It begins with an obviously painted shot of the inside of a basilica with a shaft of light, possibly descending from heaven, shining down from the ceiling, and a solemn off-screen voice pronouncing the canonization of the Maid of Orleans. Then, the opening page of what appears to be a church manuscript recounting Joan's life in Latin is shown on the screen, while some uncredited voiceover narration by actor Shepperd Strudwick sets up the tale. The actual story of Joan then begins, from the time she becomes convinced that she has been divinely called to save France to her being burnt at the stake at the hands of the English and the Burgundians.

Cast 
At Domrémy, Joan's Birthplace in Lorraine, December 1428
 Ingrid Bergman as Jeanne d'Arc
 Selena Royle as Isabelle d'Arc, her mother
 Robert Barrat as Jacques d'Arc, her father
 James Lydon as Pierre d'Arc, her younger brother
 Rand Brooks as Jean d'Arc, her older brother
 Roman Bohnen as Durand Laxart, her uncle
At Vaucouleurs, February 1429
 Irene Rich as Catherine le Royer, her friend
 Nestor Paiva as Henri le Royer, Catherine's husband
 Richard Derr as Jean de Metz, a knight
 Ray Teal as Bertrand de Poulengy, a squire
 David Bond as Jeun Fournier, Cure of Vaucouleurs
 George Zucco as Constable of Clervaux
 George Coulouris as Sir Robert de Baudricourt, Governor of Vaucouleurs
The Court of Charles VII at Chinon, March 1429
 John Emery as Jean, Duke d'Alençon, cousin of Charles
 Gene Lockhart as Georges de la Trémoille, the Dauphin's chief counselor 
 Nicholas Joy as Regnault de Chartres, Archbishop of Rheims and Chancellor of France
 Richard Ney as Charles de Bourbon, Duke de Clermont
 Vincent Donohue as Alain Chartier, court poet
 José Ferrer as The Dauphin, Charles VII, later King of France
The Army at the Battle of Orléans, May 1429
 Leif Erickson as Dunois, Bastard of Orleans
 John Ireland as Jean de la Boussac (St. Severe), a Captain
 Henry Brandon as Gilles de Rais, a Captain
 Morris Ankrum as Poton de Xaintrailles, a Captain
 Thomas Browne Henry as Raoul de Gaucourt, a Captain (credited as Tom Brown Henry)
 Gregg Barton as Louis d'Culan, a Captain
 Ethan Laidlaw as Jean d'Aulon, her squire
 Hurd Hatfield as Father Pasquerel, her Chaplain
 Ward Bond as La Hire, a Captain
The Enemy
 Frederick Worlock as John of Lancaster, Duke of Bedford, England's Regent
 Dennis Hoey as Sir William Glasdale
 Colin Keith-Johnston as Philip the Good, Duke of Burgundy
 Mary Currier as Jeane, Countess of Luxembourg
 Ray Roberts as Lionel of Wandomme, a Burgundian Captain
 J. Carrol Naish as John, Count of Luxembourg, her Captor
The Trial at Rouen, February 21 to May 30, 1431
 Francis L. Sullivan as Bishop Pierre Cauchon of Beauvais, the trial conductor
 Shepperd Strudwick as Father Jean Massieu, her Bailiff
 Taylor Holmes as the Bishop of Avranches
 Alan Napier as Earl of Warwick
 Philip Bourneuf as Jean d'Estivet, a Prosecutor
 Aubrey Mather as Jean de La Fontaine
 Herbert Rudley as Thomas de Courcelles, a Prosecutor
 Frank Puglia as Nicolas de Houppeville, a Judge
 William Conrad as Guillaume Erard, a Prosecutor
 John Parrish as Jean Beaupere, a Judge
 Victor Wood as Nicolas Midi, a Judge
 Houseley Stevenson as The Cardinal of Winchester
 Jeff Corey as her Prison Guard
 Bill Kennedy as Thierache, her Executioner
 Cecil Kellaway as Jean Le Maistre, Inquisitor of Rouen
 Louis Payne as Judge Thibault 
Uncredited
 Richard Alexander as Man on Boulevard 
 Herbert Rawlinson as Judge Marguerie 
 Russell Simpson as Old Man with Pipe 
 Vernon Steele as Boy's Father

Production

Development
Joan of Arc was made in 1947–1948 by an independent company, Sierra Pictures, created especially for this production, and not to be confused with the production company with the same name that made mostly silent films.

Filming began 16 September 1947 and was done primarily at Hal Roach Studios, with location scenes shot in the Los Angeles area.

The 1948 Sierra Pictures never produced another film after Joan of Arc.

Casting
Bergman had been lobbying to play Joan for many years, and this film was considered a dream project for her. It received mixed reviews and lower-than-expected box office, though it clearly was not a "financial disaster" as is often claimed. Donald Spoto, in a biography of Ingrid Bergman, even claims that "the critics' denunciations notwithstanding, the film earned back its investment with a sturdy profit".

The movie is considered by some to mark the start of a low period in the actress's career that lasted until she made Anastasia in 1956. In April 1949, five months after the release of the film, and before it had gone out on general release, the revelation of Bergman's extramarital relationship with Italian director Roberto Rossellini brought her American screen career to a temporary halt. The nearly two-and-a-half-hour film was drastically edited for its general release, and was not restored to its original length for nearly 50 years.

Bergman and co-star José Ferrer (making his first film appearance and playing the Dauphin) received Academy Award nominations for their performances. The film was director Victor Fleming's last project—he died only two months after its release.

In Michael Sragow's 2008 biography of the director, he claims that Fleming, who was, according to Sragrow, romantically involved with Ingrid Bergman at the time, was deeply unhappy with the finished product, and even wept upon seeing it for the first time. Sragrow speculates that the disappointment of the failed relationship and the failure of the film may have led to Fleming's fatal heart attack, but there is no real evidence to support this. While contemporary critics may have agreed with Fleming's assessment of Joan of Arc, more recent reviewers of the restored complete version on DVD have not.

Release

Original release
The movie was first released in November 1948 by RKO. When the film was shortened for its general release in 1950, 45 minutes being cut out; it was distributed, not by RKO, but by a company called Balboa Film Distributors, the same company which re-released Alfred Hitchcock's Under Capricorn, also starring Ingrid Bergman.

Restoration
The complete 145 minute version of Joan of Arc remained unseen in the U.S. for about 49 years. Although the complete Technicolor negatives remained in storage in Hollywood, the original soundtrack was thought to be lost. The movie was restored in 1998 after an uncut print in mint condition was found in Europe, containing the only known copy of the complete soundtrack. When it finally appeared on DVD, the restored complete version was hailed by online movie critics as being much superior to the edited version. It was released on DVD in 2004.

The edited version received its first television showing on the evening of April 12, 1968 (an Easter weekend), and has been shown on Ted Turner's WTCG and on cable several times. The full-length version was shown on Turner Classic Movies on March 13, 2011. This marked the first time that the complete unedited version had ever been shown on American television.

Differences in versions
There are several differences between the full-length roadshow version of the film and the edited general release version. 
One that is immediately noticeable is that there is actually a snippet from Joan's trial during the opening narration in the edited version, whereas in the full-length version, the events of Joan's life are shown in chronological order. The narration is more detailed in the edited version than in the complete version, with much of it used to cover the breaks in continuity caused by the severe editing.
The edited version omits crucial scenes that are important to a psychological understanding of the narrative, such as the mention of a dream that Joan's father has which foretells of Joan's campaign against the English. When Joan hears of the dream, she becomes convinced that she has been divinely ordered to drive the English out of France.
Most of the first ten minutes of the film, a section showing Joan praying in the Domrémy shrine, followed by a family dinner and conversation which leads to the mention of the dream, are not in the edited version.
In the complete 145-minute version, the narration is heard only at the beginning of the film, and there are no sudden breaks in continuity.
Entire characters, such as Joan's father (played by Robert Barrat) and Father Pasquerel (played by Hurd Hatfield) are partially or totally omitted from the edited version.
Even the opening credits are somewhat different, and run about two minutes longer. In the edited version, the story begins after Victor Fleming's director's credit, and in the full-length version, after the director's credit, a title card states "The Players" appears onscreen, after which all the major lead and supporting actors, as well as the characters that they play, are listed in order of appearance and in groups (e.g., "At Domrémy", "At Chinon", etc.), much like Fleming's other lengthy film epic Gone with the Wind. More than 30 of the actors are listed.

The edited version might be considered more cinematic through its use of maps and voice-over narration to explain the political situation in France. (In the full-length version, Joan's family discusses the political situation during dinner.) The full-length version, although not presented as a play-within-a-play, as the stage version was, nevertheless resembles a stage-to-film adaptation, makes great use of Maxwell Anderson's original dialogue, and may seem, to some, stagy in its method of presentation, despite having a realistic depiction of the Siege of Orléans.

Reception

Critical reception
One of the frequent criticisms of the film is that Bergman, who was 33 at the time she made the movie, was nearly twice as old as the real Joan of Arc was at the time of the events dramatized. Bergman went on, at age 39, to play Joan again in the 1954 Italian film Giovanna d'Arco al rogo (Joan at the Stake).

Several contemporary critics criticized the film for being slow-paced and dialogue-driven, as does contemporary critic Leonard Maltin, who has not yet reviewed the full-length version; he has said that there is "not enough spectacle to balance the talky sequences".

Box office
According to RKO records, the film earned $2,525,000 in theater rentals from the United States and Canada and $3,500,000 elsewhere. However, because of high cost it recorded a loss of $2,480,436.

Academy Award wins and nominations

In other media

Comic book
 Magazine Enterprises: Joan of Arc (1949)

See also
The Passion of Joan of Arc, an earlier 1928 film by Carl Theodor Dreyer
 Cultural depictions of Joan of Arc
List of historical drama films

References

External links

 

1948 films
1940s biographical drama films
1940s historical drama films
American biographical drama films
American historical drama films
Films about Joan of Arc
Cultural depictions of Gilles de Rais
American films based on plays
Films directed by Victor Fleming
Films produced by Walter Wanger
Films scored by Hugo Friedhofer
Films that won the Best Costume Design Academy Award
Films whose cinematographer won the Best Cinematography Academy Award
Films adapted into comics
1940s English-language films
1940s American films
American epic films